Edebäck is a village situated in Hagfors Municipality, Värmland County, Sweden with 214 inhabitants in 2005.

References 

Populated places in Värmland County
Populated places in Hagfors Municipality